Mollesaurus is an extinct genus of large ophthalmosaurine ophthalmosaurid ichthyosaur known from northwestern Patagonia of Argentina.

Etymology 
Mollesaurus was named by Marta S. Fernández in 1999 and the type species is Mollesaurus periallus. The generic name is derived from the name of the Los Molles Formation, where the holotype was collected, and sauros, Greek for "lizard". The specific name is derived from periallos, Greek for "before all others", in reference to the fact that it is the oldest ophthalmosaurid and one of the oldest thunnosaurs.

History of study
Mollesaurus is known from the holotype MOZ 2282 V, articulated partial skeleton which preserved partial skull and most of the vertebral column. It was collected in the Chacaico Sur locality from the Emileia giebeli ammonoid zone of the Los Molles Formation, Cuyo Group, dating to the early Bajocian stage of the Middle Jurassic, about 171.6-170 million years ago. Mollesaurus, along with Chacaicosaurus cayi which was found at the same locality, are the only diagnostic ichthyosaur specimens from the Aalenian-Bathonian interval. It was found near Zapala city of the Neuquén Basin.

Maisch and Matzke (2000) regarded Mollesaurus to be a species of Ophthalmosaurus. However, all recent cladistic analyses found that Mollesaurus is a valid genus of ophthalmosaurid. Patrick S. Druckenmiller and Erin E. Maxwell (2010) found it to be the basalmost member of the ophthalmosaurid lineage that included Brachypterygius, Caypullisaurus and Platypterygius (but not Ophthalmosaurus). Valentin Fischer, Michael W. Maisch, Darren Naish, Ralf Kosma, Jeff Liston, Ulrich Joger, Fritz J. Krüger, Judith Pardo Pérez, Jessica Tainsh and Robert M. Appleby (2012) found it to be the basalmost member of Ophthalmosaurinae.

Phylogeny
The following cladogram shows a possible phylogenetic position of Mollesaurus in Ophthalmosauridae according to the analysis performed by Zverkov and Jacobs (2020).

See also 
 List of ichthyosaurs
 Timeline of ichthyosaur research

References 

Ophthalmosaurinae
Middle Jurassic ichthyosaurs
Bajocian life
Middle Jurassic reptiles of South America
Jurassic Argentina
Fossils of Argentina
Neuquén Basin
Fossil taxa described in 1999
Ichthyosauromorph genera